Frydrychowo  is a village in the administrative district of Gmina Parchowo, within Bytów County, Pomeranian Voivodeship, in northern Poland.

For details of the history of the region, see History of Pomerania.

The village has a population of 17.

Notable residents 
Erwin Blask (1910–1999), athlete

References

Frydrychowo